Urana County is one of the 141 Cadastral divisions of New South Wales. It contains the towns of Urana and Bidgeemia.

The name Urana is believed to be derived from a local Aboriginal word, and is referenced in relation to the town of Urana, New South Wales as coming from the Aboriginal word 'airana', meaning a temporary shelter (usually consisting of a simple frame of branches covered with bark, leaves, or grass).

Parishes within this county
A full list of parishes found within this county; their current LGA and mapping coordinates to the approximate centre of each location is as follows:

References

Counties of New South Wales